is a Japanese former football player and manager.

Playing career
Hashimoto was born in Hitachi on May 13, 1970. After graduating from Tokai University, he joined Gamba Osaka in 1993. He played many matches as center back in 1994 and 1995. However he could hardly play in the match in 1996 and he moved to Japan Football League club Sagan Tosu in 1997. He played as regular player in two seasons and he retired end of 1998 season.

Coaching career
After retirement, Hashimoto started his coaching career at Sagawa Express Osaka in 1999. In 2000, he moved to Regional Leagues club Sagawa Printing and became a coach. The club was promoted to Japan Football League from 2003, and he also became a manager in 2003. In 2004, he moved to Regional Leagues club Central Kobe (later Banditonce Kobe, Banditonce Kakogawa). He managed the club until 2006. In 2007, he moved to Sagawa Printing again and managed in one season. In 2008, he moved to Banditonce Kakogawa again and became a manager in 2009. He managed the club until 2016. In 2017, he moved to Regional Leagues club Lagend Shiga FC. He resigned in July 2018.

Club statistics

References

External links

web.archive.org

1970 births
Living people
Tokai University alumni
Association football people from Ibaraki Prefecture
Japanese footballers
J1 League players
Japan Football League (1992–1998) players
Gamba Osaka players
Sagan Tosu players
Japanese football managers
Association football defenders